TRT Kurdî is the first national television station that broadcasts in Kurdish  dialect of Kurmanji and in Zazaki. On the channels sixth anniversary it changed its name from TRT 6 into TRT Kurdi. The channel has been mostly met with criticism from the Kurdish population in Turkey on various grounds, including accusations of being a mouthpiece for the government. A 2018 survey asking Kurds about TRT Kurdî showed that a majority did not trust the channel.

Opening and objective 
The ban on the Kurdish language in Turkey was lifted in 2001 and legal barriers to broadcast in the language were removed the following year. In 2004, new regulations were passed, following which TRT was allowed to broadcast 30 minutes in Kurdish. Turkish Radio and Television Corporation subsequently broadcast programs in Kurdish with limited duration. These limitations were later removed and TRT 6 was launched in 2009, which researcher Mesut Yeğen argues was the result of an understanding that Turkey had failed at assimilating its Kurdish minority. Both the Nationalist Movement Party and Republican People's Party were against this initiative and anti-Kurdish sentiment rose among Turkish nationalists.

In addition, an informal cause of the channel was to reduce the influence of Roj TV, which was regarded as PKK's main broadcast channel. Unlike Roj TV and other diasporic Kurdish channels, the objective of TRT Kurdî was not to serve Kurdish political nor cultural empowerment, as researcher Esra Arsan furthermore writes:

Reception 
Most Kurds reject TRT Kurdî and accuse it of being a propaganda tool to Turkify the Kurdish population. The members of parliament of the pro-Kurdish Democratic Society Party (DTP) did not attend to the opening of TRT 6 at the time. The imprisoned leader of the Kurdistan Workers' Party (PKK) Abdullah Öcalan also didn't support its establishment with Murat Karayilan calling for a boycott of the channel and its imprisoned leader Abdullah Öcalan viewed it as the American imposition for a solution for the Kurdish-Turkish conflict. OdaTV has also described TRT Kurdî as the most important propaganda tool by the AKP on the Kurds, and Head of the Kurdish Writers' Association Irfan Babaoğlu argued that the station was an attempt to distract Kurds from the lack of overall cultural rights. It has been criticized as portraying the current pro-Kurdish Peoples Democratic Party (HDP) officials in a violent manner in a TV show called Pivaz. In the show, actors play HDP officials of having ties to the Kurdistan Workers Party (which is classified as a terrorist organization by Turkey) or even threatening people who visit the party headquarters of being shot.

References

External links 
 

Television stations in Turkey
Kurdish-language television stations
Television channels and stations established in 2009
2009 establishments in Turkey
Turkish Radio and Television Corporation